The Traitor Baru Cormorant is a 2015 hard fantasy novel by Seth Dickinson, and his debut novel. It was published as The Traitor in the United Kingdom. It is based on a short story Dickinson wrote in 2011 for Beneath Ceaseless Skies called "The Traitor Baru Cormorant, Her Field-General, and Their Wounds".

The novel follows Baru, a brilliant young woman who, educated in the schools of the imperial power that subjugated her homeland, sets out to gain power to subvert the empire from within. A sequel, The Monster Baru Cormorant, was released on 30 October 2018. A third novel, The Tyrant Baru Cormorant, was released on August 11, 2020.

Synopsis
As a child, Baru Cormorant's island of Taranoke is annexed by the Imperial Republic of Falcrest, called the Masquerade because of the masks worn by its officials. They kill one of Baru's fathers and institute their own rigid belief system focused on hygiene and puritanical sexual ethics. Baru is educated at a Masquerade school, but vows to work her way upward within the Empire and eventually free her island.

At her school, Baru demonstrates extreme mathematical prowess. She is noticed by Cairdine Farrier, a high-ranking Masquerade official. Farrier elevates her to the position of Imperial Accountant of Aurdwynn, a province of thirteen duchies that often rebels against Masquerade rule. Baru uses her financial expertise to manipulate the Masquerade's fiat currency system. This causes rapid inflation and widespread poverty, but crushes an incipient rebellion by Duchess Tain Hu. Eventually, Baru becomes friendly with Tain Hu and other Aurdwynni nobles; she agrees to join them in revolt against the Masquerade. Baru uses her financial powers to grant loans to the commoners, which enriches Aurdwynn and ensures that her rebellion will gain popular support.

Baru leads an army against the Masquerade forces and takes Tain Hu as her lover. After a brief victory, the Aurdwynni army is ambushed by the Masquerade navy. The rebellious dukes and duchesses are all killed except for Tain Hu. Baru reveals that she has been an agent of the Masquerade throughout the rebellion; in exchange for crushing the nobility in Aurdwynn, she will be given rule of Taranoke and elevated to the Masquerade's ruling clique. As a final test of loyalty, the Masquerade committee members ask Baru to kill Tain Hu. They then offer to spare her in exchange for Baru's loyalty. Hu signals that she does not wish to be used as a pawn. In obedience to her lover's wishes, Baru allows Tain Hu to be executed. This choice protects Baru from blackmail, leaving her free to pursue revenge against the Empire.

Reception
The Traitor Baru Cormorant was well received by critics. Publishers Weekly appreciated the "seductively complex", ambitious worldbuilding and the "subtle language" of Dickinson's "compelling, utterly surprising narrative". Niall Alexander, writing for Tor.com, characterized the novel as "one of 2015's very finest fantasies" and as "clever and subversive" in the vein of K. J. Parker's best works, highlighting its "intricately crafted narrative and character".

At NPR, Amal El-Mohtar praised the "crucial, necessary" novel for its brutality in looking "unflinchingly into the self-replicating virus of empire", noting in particular the unexpectedly "viscerally riveting" portrayal of economic conflict. Dickinson has blogged about explicitly addressing issues around gender and feminism, race and homosexuality, as well as imperialism in the world of Baru Cormorant.

See also 
 Feminist science fiction
 LGBT themes in speculative fiction
 Colonialism and Imperialism

References 

2015 American novels
2015 debut novels
2015 fantasy novels
2015 LGBT-related literary works
2010s LGBT novels
American fantasy novels
American LGBT novels
Eugenics in fiction
Feminist novels
LGBT speculative fiction novels
Nautical novels
Novels about colonialism
Novels about geopolitics
Novels about racism
Novels about revolutions
American war novels
Tor Books books